This is a list of the National Register of Historic Places listings in Bosque County, Texas.

This is intended to be a complete list of properties and districts listed on the National Register of Historic Places in Bosque County, Texas. There are two districts and 37 individual properties listed on the National Register in the county. An additional, formerly listed property has since been removed. Two individual properties are State Antiquities Landmarks. One of these, along with two others, are Recorded Texas Historic Landmarks. One district contains additional Recorded Texas Historic Landmarks.

Current listings

The publicly disclosed locations of National Register properties and districts may be seen in a mapping service provided.

|}

Former listing

|}

See also

National Register of Historic Places listings in Texas
Recorded Texas Historic Landmarks in Bosque County

References

External links

Registered Historic Places
Bosque County